The Internal Security Department is Brunei's domestic intelligence agency, which is under the Prime Minister's Office. They are known to detain anyone suspected of being a threat to Brunei's national security threat for as long as needed.

They are involved in both criminal and intelligence matters.

History
The ISD was created to replace the Royal Brunei Police's Special Branch division, which was disbanded on August 1, 1993.

References

External links
 Official Site

Government of Brunei
Law enforcement agencies of Brunei
Bruneian intelligence agencies
Government agencies of Brunei